is a Japanese women's university in Matsudo, Chiba. It has faculties of Childhood Education, Literature and Social Sciences, Music, and Nutrition, as well as an affiliated Junior College. It was founded in 1990 and is accredited by the Japanese Ministry of Education.

It was named after the 7th-century regent Shōtoku. Shō (Go'on reading) can also be read sei (Kan’on reading); the latter was chosen for this school.

References

External links 
  

Private universities and colleges in Japan
Universities and colleges in Chiba Prefecture
Matsudo
Women's universities and colleges in Japan